The Union of French Baptist Churches in Canada (French: L'Union d'Églises baptistes francophones du Canada) is an association of Baptist churches for French-speaking Canadians. Headquarters is in Fulford, Quebec. The union is one of four regions of Canadian Baptist Ministries. The denomination is a member of the Evangelical Fellowship of Canada.

History
In 1837, the Swiss missionaries Henriette Feller and Louis Roussy arrived for the Grande Ligne Mission in Montreal and the Eastern Townships.  The churches resulting from this movement officially organized in 1969 form l'Union d'Églises baptistes françaises au Canada. The union became part of the Canadian Baptist Ministries in 1970.

The Union opened a bible college, the Faculté de Théologie évangélique (Evangelical Theology Faculty), in 1982, in Montreal, Quebec.

In 2010, it had 29 member churches. 

According to a denomination census released in 2020, it claimed 34 churches.

Beliefs  
The denomination has a Baptist confession of faith. The Union is a member of Canadian Baptist Ministries and Evangelical Fellowship of Canada.

References

External links
Union d'Églises baptistes francophones du Canada – French language Web Site

Baptist Christianity in Canada
Christian organizations established in 1969
Baptist denominations established in the 20th century
French Canadian culture
Baptist denominations in North America